Hurtado is a Spanish surname. Notable people with the surname include:

Alberto Hurtado (1901–1952), Chilean Jesuit priest, lawyer, social worker and writer
Álvaro Gómez Hurtado (1919–1995), Colombian lawyer, politician, and journalist
Angélica Rivera Hurtado (born 1969), Mexican singer, model and telenovela actress
Amparo Hurtado Albir, Spanish professor, translator and researcher
Avilés Hurtado (born 1987), Colombian football player
Caspar Hurtado (1575–1647), Spanish Jesuit theologian
Cheo Hurtado (born 1960), Venezuelan musician
Diosbelys Hurtado (born 1973), Cuban boxer
Edison Hurtado (born 1972), Colombian wrestler
Eduardo Hurtado (born 1969), Ecuadorian football player
Edwin Hurtado (born 1970), American baseball player
Erik Hurtado (born 1990), American football player
Ezequiel Hurtado (1825–1890), Colombian soldier and politician
Fabio Hurtado (born 1960), Spanish contemporary painter
Ferran Hurtado (1951–2014), Spanish mathematician and computer scientist
Gaspar Hurtado (1575–1647), Spanish Jesuit theologian
Héctor Hurtado (born 1975), Colombian football player
Iván Hurtado (born 1974), Ecuadorian football player
Jan Carlos Hurtado (born 2000), Venezuelan football player
Jaime Hurtado (1937–1999), Ecuadorian politician
Jhon Kennedy Hurtado (born 1984), Colombian football player
Jordi Hurtado (born 1958), Spanish radio and television presenter
José María Robles Hurtado (1888–1927), Mexican priest
Josetty Hurtado (born 1988), Peruvian actress and dancer
Julián Hurtado (born 1979), Colombian football player
Koob Hurtado (born 1985), Ecuadorian football player
Larry Hurtado (1943–2019), American New Testament scholar
Luchita Hurtado (1920–2020), Venezuelan-American artist
Luis Hurtado (actor) (1898–1967), Spanish actor
María Eugenia Hurtado Azpeitia, Mexican architect
Melissa Hurtado (born 1988), American politician in California
Miguel de la Madrid Hurtado, (1934 - 2012), Mexican president
Miguel Hurtado (born 1978), Spanish astronomer and software developer
Moisés Hurtado (born 1981), Spanish football player
Osvaldo Hurtado (born 1939), President of Ecuador
Osvaldo Hurtado (footballer) (born 1957), Chilean football player
Paolo Hurtado (born 1990), Peruvian football player
Ricardo Hurtado (born 1999), American actor
Rodolfo Hurtado (1940–2005), Mexican artist

See also 
Andrés Hurtado de Mendoza, 3rd Marquis of Cañete (circa 1500–1561), Spanish military officer
Antonio Hurtado de Mendoza (1586–1644), Spanish dramatist
Diego Evelino Hurtado de Compostela (1638–1704), Bishop of Diocese of Santiago de Cuba
Diego Hurtado de Mendoza (1503–1575), Spanish novelist, poet, diplomat and historian
García Hurtado de Mendoza, 5th Marquis of Cañete (1535–1609), Spanish soldier
Furtado
Hurtado (Panama), a subdivision of La Chorrera District in Panamá Province, Panama
Jorge Carlos Hurtado Valdez (born 1949), Mexican politician
Sebastián Hurtado de Corcuera (died 1660), Spanish soldier and colonial official
Teresa Hurtado de Ory (born 1983), Spanish actress

References

Spanish-language surnames